The Bruneian order of precedence is a nominal and symbolic hierarchy of important positions within the Government of Brunei. It has no legal standing but is used to dictate ceremonial protocol at events of a national nature. The order of precedence is determined by the Sultan on the recommendation of National Ceremonies Department.

Details 
The following lists precedence of offices and their holders .

References 

Brunei
Politics of Brunei